7 is the third English studio album and seventh studio album overall (hence the title) released by Enrique Iglesias. The album was released on 25 November 2003. Coming off from the massive success of his 2001 release Escape that established him as one of the most important and biggest selling Latin figures of the music industry worldwide alongside Ricky Martin and Shakira. None of its singles cracked the Billboard Hot 100, though the second and last single "Not in Love" was a moderated hit in Europe. The album received mixed reviews, with critics comparing it negatively with his 2001 album saying it did not live up to the expectations that Escape had created. After this album, Enrique took a three-year break from music business.

Background
Enrique Iglesias wrote or co-wrote and co-produced every track on the album. Jimmy Iovine was the executive producer of the album alongside Iglesias. Iglesias told the Toronto Sun that he took special care with the songwriting on the album. "I concentrated a lot on the lyrical content of this album and just tried to be as honest as possible. I wanted to write songs that I won't feel silly singing 10 years from now." 7 reached number 31 on the Billboard 200 and has sold 49,000 copies according to Nielsen Soundscan. While the first single "Addicted" reached number 38 on the Mainstream Top 40 chart, the Spanish version "Adicto" reached the Latin Top Ten. The second single "Not in Love" has reached the top of dance track charts in the US. The album made the UK and Australian top 100 albums in November 2003. "Addicted" made the top 40 charts in a number of countries including Germany, Australia, Portugal and Argentina.

Singles
"Addicted" was released as the album's lead single on 14 October 2003. Iglesias claimed he wrote the song while on tour in East Germany, on a dismal day, when he was inspired by the gothic Architecture. It was a modest hit on the UK Singles Chart, where it charted within the top twenty, though it failed to chart on the Billboard Hot 100. The Spanish version, titled "Adicto", peaked inside the top ten on the Hot Latin Tracks Chart.

"Not in Love" was released as the album's second and last single on 7 February 2004. The song was written by Iglesias, Paul Barry, Mark Taylor and Fernando Garibay. The album version features Iglesias's vocals only, however, the radio and single mix features an extra verse and chorus performed by Kelis. It peaked at number five on the UK Singles Chart, however, again failed to make the Billboard Hot 100.

Track listing 

Notes
 signifies a co-producer
 signifies a remixer
On physical releases, "California Callin'" duration is mistakenly printed as 4:49

Charts

Weekly charts

Year-end charts

Certifications and sales

Australian tour

References

External links
 Enrique Iglesias Official Artist Club
 7 Allmusic album page
 Toronto Sun Enrique Iglesias article
 Enrique Iglesias Top 40 charts artist page

Enrique Iglesias albums
2003 albums
Albums produced by Jimmy Iovine
Albums produced by Fernando Garibay
Albums produced by Mark Taylor (music producer)